Xolani Mdaki (born 7 July 1992) is a South African footballer who plays as a midfielder for Royal Eagles.

References

External links

1992 births
Living people
Association football midfielders
Djurgårdens IF Fotboll players
South African soccer players
South African expatriate soccer players
Expatriate footballers in Sweden